Mark Thomas Wasinger (born August 4, 1961) is an American professional baseball scout and front-office official, and a former Major League player.

Playing career

Amateur
Born in Monterey, California, Wasinger attended Old Dominion University. In 1981, he played collegiate summer baseball with the Cotuit Kettleers of the Cape Cod Baseball League. He was a third-round selection by the Padres in the 1982 Major League Baseball Draft.

Professional
Wasinger rose through the Padre system, batted above .300 four times in his first five pro seasons, and was named a 1985 All-Star in the Double-A Texas League.  But, following a three-game trial with San Diego in September 1986, he was traded to San Francisco in April 1987 and would spend the rest of his big-league tenure with the Giants. He split the  season between the Giants and Triple-A, and collected 22 hits in a reserve role for San Francisco.  On May 9, 1987, in his second game as a Giant, Wasinger collected four hits in five at bats, including a home run, and scored three runs, in a 9–4 defeat of the Pittsburgh Pirates at Candlestick Park. His 888-game minor-league playing career essentially ended after the 1993 season.

Coaching/front office career
Wasinger managed in independent league baseball, then became a scout for the Padres (1996–2002), where he scouted and signed Jake Peavy in 1999.  He joined the Boston Red Sox in 2003, working as an amateur scouting regional cross-checker, a professional scout and special assignment scout for general managers Theo Epstein and Ben Cherington. He was promoted to special assistant/player personnel in January 2015.

Notes

Sources

1961 births
Living people
All-American college baseball players
American expatriate baseball players in Canada
Baseball players from California
Beaumont Golden Gators players
Boston Red Sox scouts
Colorado Springs Sky Sox players
Columbus Clippers players
Cotuit Kettleers players
Edmonton Trappers players
Idaho Falls Braves players
Las Vegas Stars (baseball) players
Major League Baseball third basemen
Midland Angels players
Old Dominion Monarchs baseball players
Phoenix Firebirds players
Reno Padres players
San Francisco Giants players
San Diego Padres players
San Diego Padres scouts